Gay Cowbourne is a Canadian former politician, who served on Toronto City Council, representing one of the two Scarborough East wards, between 2003 and 2006.

Originally from Liverpool, England, she moved to Canada in 1976 when her husband, an electrical engineer, got a job with Ontario Hydro. A teacher by training, she became an adult literacy instructor and community activist, and the president of the Centennial Community and Recreation Association. In the 2003 municipal election, Cowbourne successfully challenged Ron Moeser, who had represented the ward for fifteen years.

During her term, she chaired the Mayor's Roundtable on Seniors. She also chaired the City's Language Equity and Literacy Working Group.

She chose not to run for re-election in 2006, and Moeser won the seat again.

References

External links
 Former City Councillor Gay Cowbourne

Women municipal councillors in Canada
Toronto city councillors
Women in Ontario politics
Living people
Year of birth missing (living people)